The 2013 Canadian Soccer League season was the 16th since its establishment where a total of 21 teams from Ontario took part in the league. The season began on May 3, 2013, and concluded on November 3, 2013. SC Waterloo captured their first championship in a 3–1 victory over regular season champions Kingston FC in the CSL Championship final at Kalar Sports Park in Niagara Falls, Ontario. Waterloo became the first club to win both the First and Second Division championships in one season. While Toronto Croatia B won the second division regular season title.

The 2013 season was a controversial year where the Canadian Soccer Association announced that they would de-sanction the CSL just two months before the commencement of their season. The CSA's stated reasons were in order to implement the James Easton Report (Rethink Management Group Report) for the adoption of a new semi-professional soccer structure. In response to the move conducted by the CSA the league appealed to the Sport Dispute Resolution Centre of Canada (SDRCC), where the sport arbitrator ruled that the CSA have the right to de-sanction the CSL, but ruled that the immediate decisions and actions conducted by the CSA were unreasonable and coercive. The governing body was required to reinstate sanctioning to the CSL until the next season in order for the CSA to work with all existing leagues to fairly implement the Easton Report. Another controversial moment occurred when the CBC issued an article written by Ben Rycroft in which anonymous sources from the CSA claimed that the CSA decided to no longer sanction the CSL primarily based on the alleged reports of match fixing in the league. During the SDRCC hearing, CSA president Victor Montagliani stated that the decision to de-sanction the CSL was not made on any alleged grounds of match fixing in the CSL but strictly on the decision made by the CSA board of directors to adopt a new soccer structure in Canada.

The aftermath of the sanctioning issue resulted in a decrease in teams in both the first and second divisions as the two MLS  academy clubs along with Brantford Galaxy, Mississauga Eagles FC, and SC Toronto left the league. Though the league did return to the Halton region with the addition of Burlington SC. Both Rogers TV and Cogeco TV continued broadcasting CSL matches throughout Southern Ontario. The CSL youth development system continued its success with four Montreal Impact Academy players being signed to the first team in the MLS before their departure from the league.

First Division

Teams 
Out of the 12 teams this season, 11 returned from the 2012 season. The only expansion team was Burlington SC. The academy clubs of Toronto FC and Montreal Impact, as well as SC Toronto, quit the league, while two teams - Mississauga Eagles FC and Brantford Galaxy - will skip the current season, but retained their membership and hope to rejoin the league in 2014. While North York Astros merged with Toronto Vasas to form Astros Vasas FC.

Results

Positions by round

Standings

Goal scorers
Statistics final as of October 7, 2013

Updated: April 30, 2017 
Source: http://canadiansoccerleague.ca/2013-csl-first-division-stats/

Playoffs

Bracket
The top 8 teams will qualify for the one-game quarter final, and a one-game semi-final leading to the championship game to be played on November 3 at  Kalar Sports Park.

Quarterfinals

Semifinals

CSL Championship

Individual awards 

The annual CSL awards ceremony was held at the Sheraton on the Falls Hotel in Niagara Falls, Ontario on November 2, 2013. The majority of the awards went to regular season champions Kingston FC. Guillaume Surot became the first player in CSL history to claim three individual awards in a season. The Frenchman took home the MVP, Golden Boot, and the Rookie of the Year. While head coach Colm Muldoon with coaching credentials from Ireland was given the Coach of the Year award.

After establishing the best defensive record within the league Antonio Illic and Sven Arapovic of Toronto Croatia were voted the Goalkeeper and Defender of the Year for the second time in their careers. The league champions SC Waterloo received their first Fair Play and Respect award. Former Toronto Croatia club executive and CSL league administrator Pino Jazbec was given the Harry Paul Gauss award for his years of commitment and allegiance to the league. The CSL Referee Committee voted in favor of Justin Tasev as the best match official throughout the season.

Second Division

Teams

Standings

Second Division Playoffs

Bracket

CSL D2 Championship

Individual awards

CSL Executive Committee and Staff 
The 2013 CSL Executive Committee.

References

External links
 CSL official website

2013
Canadian Soccer League
Canadian Soccer League